According to early modern genealogist Lewys Dwnn, Dafydd ap Dafydd ap Llywelyn  was the illegitimate son of Dafydd ap Llywelyn, Prince of Wales and King of Gwynedd between 1240 and 1246. He is considered the ancestor of the Prys or Price of Esgairweddan family, who bore the royal arms of Gwynedd as their own. It is generally considered that this family, in the direct male line descent, died out on the death of Robert Price of Esgairweddan in 1702.

Dafydd ap Dafydd ap Llywelyn was presumably a minor when his father, the prince, died in 1246 and was unable to contest the throne of Gwynedd which was claimed by Owain Goch and his brother Llywelyn ap Gruffudd, his cousins. Even if he had reached his majority by the time of his father's death his path to the throne would have been contested. This was because under the settlements made between his grandfather Llywelyn Fawr and King John of England only the legitimate sons of Dafydd ap Llywelyn could accede to the throne. Owain and Llywelyn were themselves the sons of a bastard and also barred from the throne which suggests they were adults and in a position to press their claim while he was not. The identity of his mother is not known.

According to Old & Extinct Families of Meirionyddshire the last known heir male of Dafydd, Robert Price, died in 1702.

References
 Dwnn, Lewys; Heraldic Visitations of North Wales and Part of the Marches, Volume II, page 240 (plate CLXXII) as attested by William ap Dafydd Lloyd, 2 August 1588. The original manuscript was copied by William Hughes and John Davies for publication by Sir Samuel Rush Meyrick in 1846. This work was reprinted by Bridge Books 2005.
 Nicholas, Thomas; Annals and Antiquities of the Counties and County Families of Wales, page 686.

Welsh royalty
House of Aberffraw